George Goodwin may refer to:

 George Goodwin (cricketer) (1898–?), English cricketer
 George Goodwin (journalist) (1917–2015), American journalist
 George Goodwin (publisher) (1757–1844), American publisher, father of George Goodwin, Jr.
 George Goodwin Jr. (1786–1878), American publisher, businessman, and politician
 George Wayne Goodwin (born 1967), North Carolina politician
 George T. Goodwin Community Center
 George B. Goodwin (1834–1886), member of the Wisconsin State Assembly
 George Goodwin (actor) in The Pauper Millionaire
 George Goodwin (cyclist), in Herald Sun Tour

See also

George Godwin (disambiguation)